Eivind Daniel Røed (born 1 January 1992) is a retired Norwegian football defender and later manager.

He hails from Stårheim. He played for Eid IL in the 3. divisjon and represented Norway as a youth international. In the summer of 2008 he signed for Sogndal. He had trialled with SK Brann, and rejected trials at Celtic F.C. among others. He starting played for their senior team in 2010. In 2012, still only aged 20, he had major injury problems. In 2013 he was loaned out to FK Fyllingsdalen. Here, he could play in the 2. divisjon, as a central defender which he preferred, and he also knew people in the Christian milieu of the city. He moved down in the 4. divisjon in 2014 when joining Norheimsund IL. In 2015 he played for Eid, but returned to Norheimsund.

He also became an academy coach in SK Brann in 2014. He later became player-manager of Norheimsund while working as a sports teacher at Framnes Christian Upper Secondary School.

References

1992 births
Living people
People from Nordfjordeid
Norwegian footballers
Sogndal Fotball players
FK Fyllingsdalen players
Eliteserien players
Association football defenders
Norway youth international footballers
SK Brann non-playing staff
Sportspeople from Vestland